Hyperochtha justa is a moth in the family Lecithoceridae. It was described by Edward Meyrick in 1910. It is found in Sri Lanka, India and Pakistan.

The wingspan is 11–12 mm. The forewings are grey closely irrorated (sprinkled) with dark fuscous and with small ochreous-whitish dots on the costa at four-fifths and the tornus. The hindwings are grey.

References

Moths described in 1910
Hyperochtha